Mieczysław Wilczek (25 January 1932 – 30 April 2014) was a Polish politician, chemist, and businessman who was Minister of Industry from 1988 to 1989.

References

1932 births
2014 suicides
Polish chemists
Polish businesspeople
Polish United Workers' Party members
Suicides in Poland
Government ministers of Poland
Polish Round Table Talks participants